Super Cup is the highest-budgeted football competition organized by the Bangladesh Football Federation and is one of the two club football season cups in Bangladesh, the other being Federation Cup. It started in 2009. The tournament is currently sponsored by Grameenphone.

History 

The competition kicked off for the first time on Wednesday, 11 March 2009 inaugurated by Citycell's Chief Executive Officer Michel Seamour and the Federation's president Kazi Salahuddin in which Mohammedan Sporting Club became the first champion beating arch-rival Abahani Limited. The prize money for the tournament was $150,000 which is said to be a record in Asia. Mohammedan defeated the country's Premier League winners Abahani 1–0 in an exciting final attended by a crowd of 40,000 in the country's main international football venue Bangabandhu National Stadium.

The second Super Cup was on 6 August 2011 at Bangabandhu National Stadium by 2010–2011 season champion Abahani Ltd beating Mohammedan SC in a heated remeet.

The third Super Cup was held in June 2013 in which Mohammedan Sporting Club became champion for the second time by beating 2012–13 Bangladesh Football Premier League champion Sheikh Russel KC.

Winners
 2009 : Mohammedan Sporting Club
 2011 : Abahani Limited
 2013 : Mohammedan Sporting Club

Statistics by club

Sponsorship
 2009 : Citycell
 2011 & 2013 : Grameenphone

See also
 Dhaka Derby
 Football in Bangladesh
 List of Bangladeshi football champions

References

Football cup competitions in Bangladesh
Bangladesh
2009 establishments in Bangladesh
Recurring sporting events established in 2009